The Drake Bay Formation is a Pliocene stratigraphic unit in California. In 1993, paleontologists excavated a whale skeleton associated with fossil shark teeth and fish vertebrae that may have belonged to a giant salmon from Drake Bay sediments at Point Reyes National Seashore.

Footnotes

References
 Hunt, ReBecca K., Vincent L. Santucci and Jason Kenworthy. 2006. "A preliminary inventory of fossil fish from National Park Service units." in S.G. Lucas, J.A. Spielmann, P.M. Hester, J.P. Kenworthy, and V.L. Santucci (ed.s), Fossils from Federal Lands. New Mexico Museum of Natural History and Science Bulletin 34, pp. 63–69.

Geologic formations of California